Van der Velde, Vandervelde or Vander Velde is a Dutch-language toponymic surname meaning "from the field". Common variations on this name include Van der Velden, Van de Velde and Vandevelde.

Notable people with the surname include:

Carl Franz van der Velde (1779–1824), German judge and author of historical novels
Carol Ruth Vander Velde (1926–1972), American mathematician
Charles William Meredith van de Velde (1818-1898) Dutch  painter and cartographer
Darryl van der Velde (van de Velde?) (b. 1950), Australian rugby league footballer and coach
David Vandervelde, American indie-pop musician
Emile Vandervelde (1866–1938), Belgian politician, President of the International Socialist Bureau
Hennie van der Velde (b. 1944), Dutch swimmer
Janika Vandervelde (b. 1955), American composer
Johan van der Velde (b. 1956), Dutch cyclist
Julian Vandervelde (b. 1987), American football player
Jürgen Van der Velde (b. 1977), Belgian football goalkeeper
Nadine Van der Velde (b. 1962), Canadian American actress, producer and writer
Ricardo van der Velde (b. 1987), Dutch cyclist
Riemer van der Velde (b. 1940), Dutch football club chairman
Rien van der Velde (b. 1957), Dutch politician
Sam Vandervelde (b. 1971), American mathematician

See also
Vandervelde metro station, metro station in Brussels
Van de Velde

References

Van der Velde
Dutch toponymic surnames